Mark Forrest (born 3 December 1996) is an English professional footballer who plays as a forward.

Career

College and amateur
Forrest played four years of college soccer at Lehigh University between 2015 and 2018, making 73 appearances, scoring 41 goals and tallying 21 assists.

Forrest also played with Premier Development League side Lehigh Valley United in 2017 and Reading United AC in 2018.

Professional
On 14 January 2019, Forrest was selected 77th overall in the 2019 MLS SuperDraft by Chicago Fire.

Forrest signed his first professional deal with USL Championship club Pittsburgh Riverhounds SC on 29 March 2019.

Personal
Forrest was born in England, before his family moved to Douglassville, Pennsylvania when he was 5 years old. He is a 2015 graduate of The Hill School

References

1996 births
Living people
English footballers
American soccer players
Association football forwards
Lehigh Mountain Hawks men's soccer players
Lehigh Valley United players
Reading United A.C. players
Chicago Fire FC draft picks
Pittsburgh Riverhounds SC players
Soccer players from Pennsylvania
USL Championship players
USL League Two players
The Hill School alumni